Brotherhood Creed was a rap group who were signed to MCA Records in the 1990s. Their self-titled debut album was released in 1992 and scored a number-three hit with the single "Helluva" on the US Rap chart, their single "50/50 Love" also charted on the US R&B chart.

The band appeared on the 1992 Soul Train Music Awards.

Discography

Albums

Singles

References

American hip hop groups
MCA Records artists
American musical duos
Hip hop duos